Hebraica-Rebouças is a train station on ViaMobilidade Line 9-Emerald, located in the district of Pinheiros in São Paulo. The station is located next to Eldorado Shopping Mall and the São Paulo A Hebraica club. It was built by CPTM and opened on 14 June 2000.

References

Railway stations opened in 2000
2000 establishments in Brazil